Exelastis pumilio is a moth of the family Pterophoridae. It has worldwide tropical distribution, including Argentina, Brazil, Colombia, Costa Rica, Cuba, Ecuador, Guadeloupe, Jamaica, Mexico, Puerto Rico, Suriname, Japan, Micronesia, South Africa the Virgin Islands as well as Queensland and New Guinea.

The wingspan is 12–15 mm. Adults are on wing in March, April and June.

Foodplants

Larvae have been recorded feeding on Desmodium incanum, Alysicarpus vaginalis and Oxalis sp. In India it was recorded feeding on Boerhaavia repens from India and Sri Lanka (Fletcher 1909, 1921) and Boerhaavia diffusa from Hawaii (Zimmerman 1958). In Guam some specimens were obtained from Boerhaavia sp.

Taxonomy 
The genus Hepalastis is often treated as a synonym of Exelastis.

References

External links 
 Trin Wiki
 Australian Insects
 
 Insects of Micronesia Volume 9, no. 3 Lepidoptera: Pterophoridae

Exelastini
Moths of Australia
Moths of Cape Verde
Moths of Africa
Moths of Guadeloupe
Moths of Asia
Moths of Japan
Moths of Madagascar
Moths of Réunion
Moths of Seychelles
Moths described in 1873
Taxa named by Philipp Christoph Zeller